Conoidea is a superfamily of predatory sea snails, marine gastropod mollusks within the suborder Hypsogastropoda. This superfamily is a very large group of marine mollusks, estimated at about 340 recent valid genera and subgenera, and considered by one authority to contain 4,000 named living species.

This superfamily includes the turrids, the terebras (also known as auger snails or auger shells) and the cones or cone snails. The phylogenetic relationships within this superfamily are poorly established. Several families (especially the Turridae), subfamilies and genera are thought to be polyphyletic.

In contrast to Puillandre's estimate, Bandyopadhyay et al. (2008) estimated that the superfamily Conoidea contains about 10,000 species. Tucker (2004) even speaks of 11,350 species in the group of taxa commonly referred to as turrids. 3000 recent taxa are potentially valid species. Little more than half of the known taxa are fossil species. Many species are little known and need more investigation to find their exact systematic place.

Most species in this superfamily are small to medium, with shell lengths between 3 mm and 50 mm. They occur in diverse marine habitats from tropical waters to the poles, in shallow or deep waters, and on hard to soft substrates.

The superfamily is known for its toxoglossan radula, which is used to inject powerful neurotoxins into its prey. This makes these species powerful carnivorous predators on annelid, other mollusc and even fish.

Within the superfamily there are four somewhat different varieties of radula. The radula types are as follows:
 Type 1 Drilliidae type: five teeth in each row with comb-like lateral teeth and flat-pointed marginal teeth
 Type 2 Turridae s.l. type: two or three teeth in a row with the marginal teeth being of the duplex or wishbone form.
 Type 3 Pseudomelatomidae type: two or three teeth in a row with curved and solid marginal teeth.
 Type 4 hypodermic type: two hollow, enrolled, marginal teeth in each row with an absent or reduced radular membrane.

In 2009, a proposed new classification of this superfamily was published by John K. Tucker and Manuel J. Tenorio.  In 2011, a new classification of this superfamily was published by Bouchet et al.  Both classifications were based upon cladistical analyses and included modern taxonomic molecular phylogeny studies.

Families

1993 taxonomy
Families and subfamilies included within the superfamily Conoidea according to Taylor, et al. 1993
 Clavatulidae Clay, 1853
 Conidae Fleming, 1822
 Coninae – cone snails
 Clathurellinae
 Conorbiinae
 Mangeliinae
 Oenopotinae
 Raphitominae
 Drilliidae Olsson, 1964
 Pseudomelatomidae Morrison, 1964
 Strictispiridae McLean, 1971
 Terebridae Mörch, 1852 – auger shells
 Turridae H. Adams & A. Adams, 1853 (1838) – turrids
This same classification was accepted by Bouchet & Rocroi in 2005

2009 taxonomy
In 2009 John K. Tucker and Manuel J. Tenorio proposed a classification system for the cone shells and their allies (which resorb their inner walls during growth) based upon a cladistical analysis of anatomical characters including the radular tooth, the morphology (i.e. shell characters), as well as an analysis of prior molecular phylogeny studies, all of which were used to construct phylogenetic trees.  In their phylogeny, Tucker and Tenorio noted the close relationship of the cone species within the various clades, corresponding to their proposed families and genera; this also corresponded to the results of prior molecular studies by Puillandre et al. and others.  This 2009 proposed classification system also outlined the taxonomy for the other clades of Conoidean gastropods (that do not resorb their inner walls), also based upon morphological, anatomical, and molecular studies, and removes the turrid snails (which are a distinct large and diverse group) from the cone snails and creates a number of new families.  For Tucker and Tenorio’s classification system for the cone shells and their allies (and the other clades of Conoidean gastropods) see Tucker & Tenorio cone snail taxonomy 2009.

2011 taxonomy
The original classification, Taylor et al. 1993 (and Bouchet & Rocroi in 2005) was thoroughly changed by the publication in 2011 of the article. The authors presented a new classification of the Conoidea on the genus level, based on anatomical characters but also on the molecular phylogeny as presented by Puillandre N., et al., 2008. They recognize fifteen families: Conidae, Terebridae, and the polyphyletic family Turridae resolved into 13 monophyletic families (containing 358 currently recognized genera and subgenera). The authors follow tentatively the classification for the family Conidae as presented by Tucker & Tenorio, 2009  who divided the monogeneric family Conidae into 82 genera. However, there is no final opinion on this issue yet, as a new molecular phylogeny of the Conidae is in preparation. There are a number of genera within the Conoidea that could not be assigned to any family.

In 2012, a new lineage in the Conoidea was revealed, leading to the creation of a new family Bouchetispiridae Kantor, Strong & Puillandre, 2012 that includes one genus Bouchetispira Kantor, Strong & Puillandre, 2012  and one species Bouchetispira vitrea Kantor, Strong & Puillandre, 2012, which was found on an isolated sea mount off New Caledonia. This is probably the sole survivor of a larger clade.

Recognized families in the Conoidea (as of 2020):
 Borsoniidae Bellardi, 1875
 Bouchetispiridae Kantor, Strong & Puillandre, 2012
 Clathurellidae H. Adams & A. Adams, 1858
 Clavatulidae Gray, 1853
 Cochlespiridae Powell, 1942
 Conidae Fleming, 1822
 Conorbidae de Gregorio, 1880
 † Cryptoconidae Cossmann, 1896
 Drilliidae Olsson, 1964
 Fusiturridae Abdelkrim, Aznar-Cormano, Fedosov, Kantor, Lozouet, Phuong, Zaharias & Puillandre, 2018
 Horaiclavidae Bouchet, Kantor, Sysoev & Puillandre, 2011
 Mangeliidae P. Fischer, 1883
 Marshallenidae Abdelkrim, Aznar-Cormano, Fedosov, Kantor, Lozouet, Phuong, Zaharias & Puillandre, 2018 
 Mitromorphidae Casey, 1904
 Pseudomelatomidae Morrison, 1966
 Raphitomidae Bellardi, 1875
 Strictispiridae McLean, 1971
 Terebridae Mörch, 1852
 Turridae H. Adams & A. Adams, 1853 (1838)
Conoidea (unassigned)
Genera not assigned to a family:
 † Acamptogenotia Rovereto, 1899 
 † Austroclavus Powell, 1942 
 † Austrotoma Finlay, 1924 
 Bathyferula Stahlschmidt, Lamy & Fraussen, 2012
 † Campylacrum Finlay & Marwick, 1937 
 † Clinuropsis Vincent, 1913 
 † Cosmasyrinx Marwick, 1931 
 Cryptomella Finlay, 1924
 Echinoturris Powell, 1935
 Eoscobinella Powell, 1942
 † Eothesbia Finlay & Marwick, 1937 
 † Eoturris Finlay & Marwick, 1937 
 Hemipleurotoma Cossmannn, 1889
 † Insolentia Finlay, 1926 
 Mangaoparia Vella, 1954
 Maoricrassus Vella, 1954
 † Marshallaria Finlay & Marwick, 1937 
 † Moniliopsis Cossmann, 1918 
 Notogenota Powell, 1942
 † Orthosurcula Casey, 1904 
 Parasyngenochilus Long, 1981
 † Parasyrinx Finlay, 1924 
 Pleurotomoides Bronn, 1831
 † Pseudoinquisitor Powell, 1942 
 † Rugobela Finlay, 1924 
 Sinistrella Meyer, 1887
 Tahudrillia Powell, 1942
 † Tahuia Maxwell, 1992 
 † Waitara Marwick, 1931 
 † Zeatoma Maxwell, 1992
Families and subfamilies brought into synonymy
 Acusidae Gray, 1853: synonym of Terebridae Mörch, 1852
 Clavidae Casey, 1904: synonym of Drilliidae Olsson, 1964
 Clionellidae Stimpson, 1865: synonym of Clavatulidae Gray, 1853
 Conilithidae Tucker & Tenorio, 2009: synonym of Conidae Fleming, 1822
 Crassispirinae McLean, 1971: synonym of Pseudomelatomidae Morrison, 1966
 Cytharinae Thiele, 1929: synonym of Mangeliidae P. Fischer, 1883
 Daphnellinae Casey, 1904: synonym of Raphitomidae Bellardi, 1875
 Diptychomitrinae L. Bellardi, 1888: synonym of Mitromorphidae Casey, 1904
 Melatomidae Gill, 1871: synonym of Clavatulidae Gray, 1853
 Mitrolumnidae Sacco, 1904: synonym of Mitromorphidae Casey, 1904
 Oenopotinae Bogdanov, 1987: synonym of Mangeliidae P. Fischer, 1883
 Pervicaciidae Rudman, 1969: synonym of Terebridae Mörch, 1852
 Pleurotomellinae F. Nordsieck, 1968: synonym of Raphitomidae Bellardi, 1875
 Pleurotomidae: synonym of Turridae H. Adams & A. Adams, 1853 (1838)
 Pseudotominae Bellardi, 1875: synonym of Borsoniidae Bellardi, 1875
 Pusionellinae Gray, 1853: synonym of Clavatulidae Gray, 1853
 Taraninae Casey, 1904: synonym of Raphitomidae Bellardi, 1875
 Taranteconidae Tucker & Tenorio, 2009: synonym of Conidae Fleming, 1822
 Thatcheriidae Powell, 1942: synonym of Raphitomidae Bellardi, 1875
 Turriculinae Powell, 1942: synonym of Clavatulidae Gray, 1853
 Zemaciinae Sysoev, 2003: synonym of Borsoniidae Bellardi, 1875
 Zonulispirinae McLean, 1971: synonym of Pseudomelatomidae Morrison, 1966
Genera (not assigned to a family) brought into synonymy
 Defrancia Millet, 1826: synonym of Pleurotomoides Bronn, 1831
 Fusosurcula Is. Taki, 1951: synonym of † Orthosurcula Casey, 1904
 † Lirasyrinx Powell, 1942: synonym of † Parasyrinx Finlay, 1924 
 † Tholitoma Finlay & Marwick, 1937: synonym of † Cosmasyrinx (Tholitoma) Finlay & Marwick, 1937 represented as † Cosmasyrinx Marwick, 1931 
 Waitara Marwick, 1931 †: synonym of Thatcheria Angas, 1877

References

Secondary sources

External links 
 

 
Neogastropoda
Gastropod superfamilies
Marine gastropods